This list of shipwrecks in 1805 includes ships sunk, foundered, wrecked, grounded, or otherwise lost during 1805.

January

1 January

2 January

3 January

4 January

5 January

7 January

8 January

13 January

15 January

16 January

17 January

18 January

19 January

20 January

21 January

22 January

23 January

25 January

26 January

28 January

29 January

30 January

31 January

Unknown date

February

3 February

4 February

5 February

7 February

8 February

9 February

10 February

12 February

14 February

16 February

20 February

25 February

26 February

27 February

Unknown date

March

1 March

2 March

5 March

6 March

7 March

8 March

9 March

12 March

16 March

19 March

21 March

23 March

29 March

30 March

31 March

Unknown date

April

1 April

5 April

6 April

14 April

18 April

23 April

24 April

25 April

27 April

29 April

Unknown date

May

1 May

4 May

9 May

10 May

14 May

17 May

21 May

Unknown date

June

5 June

22 June

24 June

30 June

Unknown date

July

7 July

11 July

12 July

31 July

Unknown date

August

1 August

6 August

7 August

10 August

15 August

16 August

17 August

25 August

29 August

Unknown date

September

3 September

5 September

7 September

8 September

10 September

12 September

16 September

17 September

18 September

19 September

21 September

23 September

25 September

26 September

30 September

Unknown date

October

1 October

3 October

4 October

6 October

11 October

14 October

15 October

17 October

18 October

20 October

21 October

22 October

23 October

24 October

26 October

28 October

Unknown date

November

1 November

3 November

4 November

10 November

12 November

13 November

14 November

15 November

16 November

17 November

18 November

21 November

24 November

25 November

27 November

30 November

Unknown date

December

2 December

6 December

7 December

10 December

11 December

13 December

14 December

15 December

16 December

19 December

20 December

23 December

24 December

26 December

27 December

28 December

Unknown date

Unknown date

References

1805